Mohamed Orabi (Arabic: محمد العرابي, born 1951) is an Egyptian diplomat and politician who was the Foreign Minister of Egypt in Essam Sharaf's cabinet from 18 June 2011 to 18 July 2011.

Career
Orabi worked in the Egyptian Army before he joined the foreign service in 1976. Then he became a career diplomat. He was deputy chief of the Egyptian mission in Israel from 1994 to 1998 and in the US. He also served in Kuwait and in the United Kingdom as Egyptian diplomat. He served as chief of the cabinet of the foreign minister in 2000 with Amr Moussa, He was Egyptian ambassador to Germany from 2001 to 2008. Next he acted as assistant foreign minister for economic affairs.

He was appointed foreign minister in June 2011, replacing Nabil Al Arabi. However, he resigned from office in July 2011. Mohamed Kamel Amr replaced him as foreign minister.

References

1951 births
Living people
Ambassadors of Egypt to Germany
21st-century Egyptian diplomats
Foreign ministers of Egypt
Grand Crosses 1st class of the Order of Merit of the Federal Republic of Germany